Hebel Leuchtpistole Model 1894 was a flare gun used in both World Wars by Germany and various countries. 

The term Hebel (German > "lever") referred to the pistol's lever-action, not the manufacturer. The lever in front of the trigger guard was flipped up and forward to open the breech.

References

1894 establishments in Germany
1918 disestablishments in Germany
Flare guns
World War I German infantry weapons
World War I Austro-Hungarian infantry weapons